Pamela Parsons is a Canadian politician, who was elected to the Newfoundland and Labrador House of Assembly in the 2015 provincial election. She represents the electoral district of Harbour Grace-Port de Grave as a member of the Liberal Party.

In a special August 2017 sitting of the House of Assembly, Parsons ran for Speaker of the Assembly but was defeated by fellow Liberal Perry Trimper. In 2018, Parsons gained notable attention for her role in the House of Assembly harassment scandal; specifically for filing a complaint against then-Cabinet Minister Dale Kirby.

Parsons was re-elected in the 2019 and 2021 provincial elections. On April 8, 2021, she was appointed Minister Responsible for Women and Gender Equality.

Prior to her entry into politics, Parsons was a journalist reporting for CBC's Here and Now NL, CBC Radio NL, Roger's TV St. John's, NL "Out of the Fog".  She was the producer for First Local News, Roger's TV, in Owen Sound, Ontario.  Parsons was also a Video Journalist for NTV News Newfoundland Broadcasting Co.  She is a musician and performs at many charitable functions.

References

Living people
Liberal Party of Newfoundland and Labrador MHAs
Women MHAs in Newfoundland and Labrador
21st-century Canadian politicians
21st-century Canadian women politicians
Year of birth missing (living people)
Members of the Executive Council of Newfoundland and Labrador
Women government ministers of Canada